Profit from Loss is a 1915 American short silent Western film directed by B. Reeves Eason.

Cast
 Vivian Rich
 Walter Spencer
 Jack Richardson
 Louise Lester

External links
 

1915 films
1915 short films
1915 Western (genre) films
American silent short films
American black-and-white films
Films directed by B. Reeves Eason
Silent American Western (genre) films
1910s American films